Álvaro Djaló Dias Fernandes (born 16 August 1999) is a Spanish professional footballer who plays as a winger for the Portuguese club Braga.

Career
Born in Madrid, Djaló spent part of his upbringing in the Bilbao area and played for local clubs including  before moving to Portugal with Braga in 2017. He began his senior career with Braga's reserves in 2020, and signed his first professional contract with the club on 22 April 2022, to run until 2025. In July 2022, he started training with the senior team in preparation for the 2022–23 season.

Djaló made his professional and Primeira Liga debut as a late substitute against Sporting CP on 7 August 2022, and assisted his side's final goal to tie the game at 3–3.

Personal life
Born in Spain, Djaló is of Bissau-Guinean descent.

References

External links
 
 Álvaro Djaló at playmakerstats.com (English version of ceroacero.es)

1999 births
Living people
Footballers from Madrid
Footballers from Bilbao
Spanish footballers
Spanish people of Bissau-Guinean descent
Association football wingers
S.C. Braga players
S.C. Braga B players
Campeonato de Portugal (league) players
Primeira Liga players
Spanish expatriate footballers
Spanish expatriate sportspeople in Portugal
Expatriate footballers in Portugal